Debate between monarchists and republicans in Canada has been taking place since before the country's Confederation in 1867, though it has rarely been of significance since the rebellions of 1837. Open support for republicanism only came from the Patriotes in the early 19th century, the Red River Métis in 1869, and minor actions by the Fenians in the 19th century. However, paralleling the changes in constitutional law that saw the creation of a distinct Canadian monarchy, the emergence in the 1960s of Quebec nationalism, and the evolution of Canadian nationalism, the cultural role and relevance of the monarchy was altered and was sometimes questioned in certain circles, while continuing to receive support in others.

In 2005, it was estimated that only 0.6 per cent of the population was actively engaged in any debate about a republic. The Monarchist League of Canada's chief executive officer, Robert Finch, stated the greatest threat to the monarchy is not republicanism, "it is indifference."

The debate

The first one hundred years

In the early 19th century, reform-minded groups began to emerge in the British colonies in Canada. From them rose William Lyon Mackenzie, who, along with Louis-Joseph Papineau, was the first prominent proponent of a republican Canada. Their causes were countered by the lieutenant governors and members of the executive councils at the time, as well as a majority of the colonists, who did not espouse a break with the Crown, and the rebellions ultimately failed. Still, in the lead-up to Confederation in 1867, there did take place debate over whether the new polity should adopt a republican or monarchical form of government.

Alistair Horne observed in the late 1950s that, while Canada's cultural mix grew, the monarchy remained held in high regard: "At its lowest common denominator, to the average Canadian—whether of British, French or Ukrainian extraction—the Crown is the one thing that he has that the rich and mighty Americans have not got. It makes him feel a little superior." However, at the same time, he noted that the institution was coming more into question in Quebec and that it was sometimes perceived as having a "colonial taint", but theorized that this was because Canadians had an inferiority complex in relation to the British. At the same time, controversy arose in the run-up to the Queen's 1959 tour, when Canadian Broadcasting Corporation personality Joyce Davidson, while being interviewed by Dave Garroway on NBC's Today Show, said that, as an "average Canadian", she was "pretty indifferent" to the Queen's arrival. Davidson was lambasted in the Canadian press and by many indignant Canadians for her comment.

Constitutional evolution
Debates over the monarchy and its place in Canada took place through the 1960s and 1970s, following the rise of Quebec nationalism. Republican options were discussed following the sovereigntist Parti Québécois' (PQ) election to power in Quebec, but only specifically in relation to the province. However, the non-Quebecer attendees at the 1968 constitutional conference agreed that the monarchy had worked well and was not a matter for discussion. In 1966, when the Queen of Canada's consort, Prince Philip, Duke of Edinburgh, undertook a royal tour through Montreal, Ottawa, and Toronto, he said that, if Canadians found the monarchy no longer useful, they could get rid of it without opposition from anyone in the royal family. As the Monarchist League of Canada later put it, "this characteristically outspoken remark—undoubtedly mirroring the sovereign’s views—allowed such republican sentiment as existed to be discussed openly in Ottawa and through the country with the result that, some 60 years on, the institution functions well and is entrenched in Canada’s constitution."

The Cabinet, in June 1978, put forward the constitutional amendment Bill C-60 that, among other changes, potentially affected the sovereign's role as head of state by vesting executive authority in the governor general and renaming the position as First Canadian. Some academics, such as Ted McWhinney, supported these proposals, though they were opposed by others, like Senator Eugene Forsey, who said that the government had managed to "[stir] up a hornet's nest with a short stick." From that year's First Ministers' conference in Regina, Saskatchewan, the provincial premiers (including that of Quebec) issued a statement against what they saw as a unilateral attempt by the federal government to push through alterations to the monarchy and expressed their opposition to "constitutional changes that substitute for the Queen as ultimate authority a Governor General whose appointment and dismissal would be solely the pleasure of the federal cabinet"—a message that was reiterated at the conclusion of the 1979 meeting and echoed in newspaper editorials. Decades later, David Smith stated that the federal government at the time had "misperceived the complexity of the Crown [and] failed... to recognize its federalist dimension."

Into the 21st century
After Prime Minister Jean Chrétien's press secretary, Peter Donolo, in 1998 unaccountably announced through a media story that the prime minister's office was considering the abolition of the monarchy as a millennium project, Chrétien stated that he was open to a public debate, but never pursued the matter and expressed concerns about resulting divisions, saying that he "already had enough trouble on [his] hands with the separatists of Quebec, and didn't want to take on the monarchists in the rest of Canada, too."

Other media at the time noted that, though there was "no longer any strong idea behind the Canadian monarchy and its representative", in the absence of which "there can be no pulse in common between the people and their constitution", there simply was no debate about any republic among the general populace, with discussion limited to a political and journalistic few. An inadequate number of willing participants was pointed to as a reason for this phenomenon—which was seen as a manifestation of what Carolyn Tuohy had called Canada's "institutionalized ambivalence"—as well as a lack of alternate model to be discussed, with no method put forward by which the powers of the Crown could be soundly transferred to a president, no definitive solution to where Canadian sovereignty would be placed should the sovereign be removed from Canada, nor any means by which the constitutionally required consent of all 11 parliaments (one federal and 10 provincial) could be achieved. It was also theorized that Canadians had a growing sense of distrust for politicians (which a president would be), more pressing issues to deal with, and no appetite for nationally divisive constitutional change. Political scholar David Smith expressed his thoughts on how the Canadian monarchy had benefited from this dearth of discussion.

Debate on the monarchy was seen through the first decade of the 21st century in other Canadian media, generally at times of national significance, such as Canada Day and Victoria Day, or during a royal tour.

In 2007, the Quebec Minister for Intergovernmental Affairs, Benoît Pelletier, expressed his opinion that it was "not impossible that we might have to reconsider the role of the monarch, the lieutenant governor, and the governor general... I'm not saying that the monarchy must be abolished, but it will take some thought, especially on its usefulness and relevance. Two years later, Andrew Coyne called for importing "not just a King of Canada, but a Canadian King" that would reside permanently in Canada.

Into the 2020s, the Monarchist League of Canada claimed, "opponents of the Canadian Crown frequently criticize the monarchy without fully being aware of the facts. In addition, opponents often deliberately spread misinformation." Peter Woolstencroft, a retired political science professor from the University of Waterloo, opined in 2021 that "the optimal republican pathway seems to rest upon attrition through rising indifference." However, he went on to write, "Canada’s constitutional straitjacket makes abolition here highly unlikely. At best, it would take a long and contentious process, something Canadians likely do not want;" considering the differences in methods of choosing a president, in the sizes of the provinces and territories, and of their populations, in addition to the treaty relationship between First Nations and the Crown, Woolstencroft observed "over the long arc of previous constitutional discussions, a clear pattern is discernible. Matters on the table become more diverse, more complicated, more symbolically existential, with a widening set of actors, making it harder and harder to produce a coherent agreement."

The reign of Charles III
Following Elizabeth II's death in September 2022, Canadian Prime Minister Justin Trudeau stated that the monarchy's role in Canada was not open for debate and did not see Canada replacing its monarchy in the near future. During an in-person meeting with King Charles III in London, UK, Trudeau described the monarchy as offering Canada "steadiness." The following month, Bloc Québécois leader Yves-François Blanchet tabled a motion in the House of Commons, proposing that the "House express its desire to sever ties [sic] between the Canadian state and the British monarchy [sic]." Blanchet did not suggest an alternative form of government. The motion was defeated 266 to 44. Most members of Parliament condemned the move as a political stunt, as the Bloc's main aim is the separation of Quebec from Canada. Some NDP MPs, one Liberal, one Green, and one independent MP supported the motion.

Polls

Polls on the Canadian monarchy have been regularly conducted since the 1990s, typically coinciding with a royal tour or other major royal event. In 2008, Peter Boyce wrote that successive polls since the aforementioned decade showed an increasing disaffection with the monarchy, but also noted internal contradictions in specific poll results. Polls on the institution have been accused of using "inconsistent and sometimes ambiguous wording." Monarchists assert the use of the inaccurate adjective "British" in a poll question on the Canadian monarchy, or implications that the present Canadian head of state isn't Canadian, skews the results, while republicans say the same about the use of "sever" or "abolish". The polls sometimes ask about constitutionally impossible scenarios and consistently ignore both the constitutional requirements for a change to the Canadian monarchy and the existence of the provinces, which would also be affected by constitutional amendments that made Canada a republic. It has been further noted, and confirmed by polls, that Canadians are not well educated about the monarchy and its role. In 2002, the majority polled thought the prime minister was head of state, only 5 per cent knowing it was the Queen. Both republicans and monarchists in Canada have noted this fact in relation to polls on the monarchy.

1970s
When constitutional amendments were being considered in the 1960s, the role of the monarchy was not strenuously questioned, as it was deemed to be "no great priority in the present round of constitutional changes." This statement was reflected in the four opinion polls conducted in 1970, which showed that the monarchy was favoured by two-thirds of those questioned. The Canadian Institute of Public Opinion asked nationally: "Do you think Canada should continue to pay allegiance to the Queen, or do you think we should become a republic with an elected president?" To this, 50 per cent of respondents opted for retention of the status quo, 33 per cent favoured a republic, and the remainder declined to answer. Further, the answers differed by region: of the respondents who lived in Quebec, 46 per cent wished for a republic as against 23 per cent for monarchy, while, in Ontario, the monarchy was favoured well above the national average, and support was even higher in the western provinces. Older persons (over 50 years) were the strongest advocates for the monarchy than any other age group, although those in their 20s who answered the poll also gave their preference for the Crown. Similarly, another poll that year revealed that in Canada, exclusive of Quebec, the monarchy was of no issue to 37 per cent of the people polled and a further 41 per cent rated themselves as loyalists, although many of the older responders "recognised that youth had different ideas which might have an effect in the future."

1993
A 1993 poll by Angus Reid Group asked "thinking about the monarchy's role here in Canada, all things considered, do you think....", to which 45.5 per cent of respondents favoured the answer "preserve connection" and 54.5 per cent favoured "abolish connection".

2002
According to Ipsos-Reid, "Canadians [were] supportive toward the concept of the constitutional monarchy as Canada's form of government" and 62 per cent of respondents believed the monarchy helped to define Canada's identity. However, at the same time, 48 per cent of those polled agreed "constitutional monarchy is outmoded and would prefer a republican system of government with an elected head of state, like in the United States," and 65 per cent believed that the royals were simply celebrities who should not have any formal role in Canada. The same poll found that 58 per cent of respondents felt "the issue of the monarchy and the form of Canada's government isn't important to them and if the system is working OK why go through all the fuss to change it?" A poll by Léger Marketing found that 50 per cent of those polled believed the monarchy should be preserved, while 43 per cent disagreed.

2009
An August 2009 poll commissioned by the group Canadian Friends of the Royal Family found that the majority of those who answered, more than 60%, felt that a constitutional monarchy was outdated.

Three polls were conducted two months later: Léger Marketing found that 45 per cent of the respondents considered the monarchy "to be useless to Canada and feel that the country should sever all formal ties with the Queen", while 44 per cent considered the monarchy to be a tradition that should be maintained. Opposition to the institution was strongest in Quebec, where 78 per cent of those asked believed the monarchy is "useless to Canada" and should be ended, and 11 per cent wanted to maintain it. Angus Reid's results showed 27 per cent of those polled preferred Canada to remain a monarchy. The plurality. 35 per cent, preferred Canada to have an elected head of state. When asked whom they would prefer as a monarch after Queen Elizabeth II, the plurality, 37 per cent, of respondents said there should be no monarch after her. The poll by Ipsos Reid found that the majority, 53 per cent, of those who replied wanted Canada to end "its constitutional ties" to the monarchy after the Queen dies, while 49 per cent wanted to abolish the constitutional monarchy structure then and become a republic, with an elected head of state. The majority, 60 per cent, of respondents said the Queen and the royal family should have no formal role in Canadian society and that they are "simply celebrities and nothing more."

In November, another poll by Angus Reid found that two-thirds of those questioned would like to see a Canadian serving as Canada's head of state, while 18 per cent disagreed. Twenty seven per cent preferred Canada to remain a monarchy, while 43% preferred Canada to have an elected head of state.

2010–2013
In May 2010, a poll by Angus Reid found that more than two thirds of those who replied, a 69 per cent majority, would have liked to see a Canadian serving as Canada's head of state and a 52 per cent supported reopening the constitutional debate to discuss replacing the monarchy with an elected head of state, while only 32 per cent opposed doing so. Despite 69 per cent of respondents having a "mostly favourable" opinion of Queen Elizabeth II as a person, 33 per cent preferred Canada to remain a monarchy; 36 per cent said they would prefer to have an elected head of state, 21 per cent were indifferent, and 11 per cent were unsure. When asked who they would prefer as a monarch after Queen Elizabeth II, three-in-ten respondents said there should be no monarch after her and 31 per cent wanted members of the royal family to stop touring Canada. A national poll conducted a month later by the Association for Canadian Studies found 49 per cent of those asked had a negative reaction to the word "monarchy", compared to 41 per cent with a positive reaction. In the Maritimes, where the Queen would begin her Canadian tour that year, 60 per cent of those who replied registered a negative opinion of monarchy, compared to 37 per cent positive. (The poll did not refer to the Canadian monarchy or to the Queen specifically, but to the concept of monarchy.) A poll by Ipsos-Reid, also in June, found that two-in-three of those asked agreed the royal family should not have any formal role in Canadian society and reported growing sentiment that Elizabeth II should be Canada's last monarch. Fifty-eight per cent wanted Canada to end "ties" to the monarchy when Queen Elizabeth II's reign ends and 62 per cent believed that Canada's head of state should be the governor general, not the Queen.

A fifth poll, conducted by Harris-Decima for The Canadian Press a few days ahead of the Queen's nine-day tour in June, found that nearly half of respondents considered the monarchy to be "a relic of our colonial past that has no place in Canada today." The poll also found that 44 per cent of those asked wanted a national referendum to decide whether Canada should keep its monarchy. An Angus Reid poll run just after the Queen's tour found that 36% of responednts wanted Canada to remain a monarchy, 30 per cent preferred having an elected head of state, and 21 per cent felt it made no difference to them.

A poll conducted by Angus Reid in June 2011 found a decline in support for republicanism, with just 33 per cent of those who replied doing so in favour of abolishing the monarchy and 58 per cent supporting the country remaining a monarchy. When asked what words they would use to describe an upcoming royal tour, 44 per cent said "indifference", 34 per cent said "pride", 34 per cent said "enthusiasm", and 32 per cent said "joy", with the pollster noting that indifference was "largely driven by attitudes in Quebec". Elizabeth II, Prince William, and Catherine, were, among those asked, the most popular members of the royal family and, if Prince William were to be made king, 23 per cent would view the monarchy more favourably and 2 per cent would view it more unfavourably.

A 2012 poll by Harris-Decima found that the respondents, as a whole, were "relatively evenly split" over whether the monarchy should remain or be abolished, but, those from English Canada demonstrated a "growing consensus" in favour of the Crown. Overall, the number of those who found the monarchy to be an "important part of Canadian history and political culture that ought to be maintained" rose by six per cent. A Forum poll from July the following year, taken immediately after the birth of Prince George, found that 48 per cent of respondents were opposed to abolishing the monarchy, with 37 per cent in favour, and 15 per cent undecided.

2015–2021
A Forum poll, taken in May 2015, immediately after the birth of Princess Charlotte, found that 39 per cent of respondents favoured "abolishing the monarchy upon the death of the Queen," while 45 per cent were opposed; 54 per cent opposed Prince Charles (now Charles III) succeeding his mother on the throne. According to Forum, 73 per cent of those asked "agree the head of state of Canada should be Canadian-born and live in Canada," an increase from 63 per cent who had the same view in 2013.

A poll conducted in August 2017 found that 41 per cent of respondents wanted to abolish the monarchy following the death or abdication of Elizabeth II, with 43 per cent in favour of maintaining the status quo. In February 2019, a poll by Research Co concluded 31 per cent of those who replied said Canada should remain a monarchy, while 33 per cent believed Canada should have an elected head of state. Research Co's poll one year later found 32 per cent of respondents would have preferred for Canada to have an elected head of state, while 27 per cent would rather keep the monarchy. The proportion of those asked who said they did not care either way increased to 28 per cent. Another year after, Research Co ran a poll that found 45 per cent of people asked indicated a preference for Canada to have an elected head of state, while 24 per cent would rather keep the monarchy. The proportion who said they do not care either way dropped to 19 per cent.

2022-2023
In a poll conducted in February 2022 by Research Co, 49 per cent respondents claimed they would prefer for Canada to have an elected head of state, while 21 per cent would rather keep the monarchy. In addition, 34 per cent said they would like to see Prince William take over as king from Queen Elizabeth II, while only 17 per cent would rather have Prince Charles as monarch. Forty-eight per cent believed the country will “definitely” or “probably” be a monarchy two decades from now, while 30 per cent expected Canada to have an elected head of state by that time.

Research Co. took a poll in September 2022, finding more than a third of those questioned (36 per cent) said they would prefer for Canada to have an elected head of state, down 13 points since February. In contrast, just over three-in-ten (31 per cent; up 10 points) said they would like for Canada to remain a monarchy, while 24 per cent (up six points) did not care either way. Fifty two percent stated they believe Canada will still be a monarchy in 20 years; 31 percent said they think the country will have an elected head of state. The same company polled individuals again in March 2023, finding 19 percent of those questioned said they would prefer for Canada to remain a monarchy, 44 per cent would prefer for Canada to have an elected head of state, and 22 per cent have no opinion.

A web survey conducted by Leger in March 2023 found 67 per cent of those polled felt indifferent toward the accession of King Charles III and 80 percent had "no personal attachment" to the monarchy. Fify six per cent of respondents said it was time for Canada "to reconsider its ties  with the monarchy", 44 per cent being against the idea.

Polls on "British" monarchy

Some Canadian polls have referred in their questions to British monarchy or called the British monarch Canada's head of state. This terminology is at odds with the contemporary situation in Canada, wherein the monarchy is ostensibly a Canadian institution separate from that of the United Kingdom, being called the Canadian Crown and Canadian monarchy by the government and constitutional scholars, and the monarch is titled as King of Canada. The government of Saskatchewan has stated it is incorrect to denote the Canadian royal family as the British royal family. Additionally, the King of Canada is considered Canadian.

EKOS Research Associates concluded in 2002, the year of Queen Elizabeth II's Golden Jubilee, there were "highly polarized views" on the monarchy, with "little consensus for moving forward with institutional renewal." The respondents were said to be split on the relevance of the royal family, members being seen both as "interesting" and "tired", while their "historical-institutional significance" was "much more important" than their perception as celebrities; though, this question conflated the royal family with the monarchy and referred to the latter as "British". Support for abolition of the monarchy was noted as declining.

A 2005 poll by The Strategic Counsel reported Canadians to be uncertain "about the legitimacy and role of the British monarchy remaining as Canada's head of state". The poll found an equal number—47 per cent supporting and 47 per cent opposed—to retention of the "British monarchy". Two years later, Angus Reid Strategies reported that 53 per cent of respondents to its survey felt "Canada should end its formal ties to the British monarchy", while 35 per cent thought the contrary and 12 per cent were unsure. Angus Reid stated in March 2008 the majority of those it polled believe "it is time to end the country's official relationship with either the British monarchy or the monarchy."

In May 2010, an online poll by Leger Marketing for QMI Agency found that a majority (59 per cent) of Canadians said that they had little or no interest in the Queen's visit to Canada, while 39 per cent had interest. The poll found that 32 per cent of people aged 18 to 34 had an attachment to the crown. Among those 65 and older, 46 per cent reported an attachment. One-fifth of Canadians said the Queen should stay home, and that furthermore, "Canada should sever its ties with the British Crown".

Angus Reid conducted in April 2022 an online poll of members of the Angus Reid Forum, which found 51 per cent of those who answered were agreeable toward the idea of Canada "severing ties with the British monarchy". Respondents of all ages were also less keen on Elizabeth's successor, Charles, becoming king, with 67 per cent saying they moderately or strongly opposed recognizing him as Canada's next head of state. Seventy-six per cent were against the idea of Charles' wife becoming Queen Camilla. But, nearly two-thirds of those polled still viewed Queen Elizabeth II favourably. Nanos Research's poll a month later, conducted primarily around the question of whether or not Queen Elizabeth II should apologize for the Church of England's role in the Canadian Indian residential school system, found that 48 per cent of those polled opposed "cutting ties with the British monarchy" and replacing the head of state with the prime minister, while 43 per cent supported the idea. In the same poll, when asked if Canada should "cut ties" with the monarchy and replace the head of state with a governor general appointed by "the government", 48 per cent of Canadians opposed the idea, while 42 per cent supported it. Support for both proposals was strongest in Quebec, while opposition to the former proposal was strongest in the Maritimes and opposition to the latter proposal was strongest in the prairies. When asked if it was a good time to open up constitutional discussions on "cutting ties" with the monarchy, 41 per cent of those who answered said they thought it was a poor time to do so, while 39 per cent thought it was a good time to open up discussions.

A poll taken after the death of Queen Elizabeth found 54 per cent of those polled supported "sever[ing] ties" with the "British monarchy" and 58 per cent supported a national referendum on the question. The same poll found 55 per cent of respondents agree the country's constitutional monarchy helps define Canadian identity and ought to remain Canada's form of government, with six in ten agreeing Canada’s "relationship with the monarchy" is useful as it helps to differentiate Canada from the United States. Still, 63 per cent supported the idea the King and royal family should have no formal function in Canadian society, as they are "simply celebrities and nothing more".

See also
 Republicanism in Canada
 History of monarchy in Canada
 National symbols of Canada
 Annexation movements of Canada
 Citizens for a Canadian Republic
 Republicanism in Australia
 Republicanism in the United Kingdom

Notes

References

Monarchy in Canada
Political history of Canada
Legal history of Canada
Republicanism in Canada